Edward Bodkin is an American cutter (underground surgical practitioner) who was arrested in 1998 after police were tipped off that he was performing and videotaping voluntary human castrations at his home.

Bodkin, an only child who had grown up on a farm near Kokomo, Indiana, began advertising his services in the short-lived Ball Club Quarterly magazine, and castrated his "clients" in exchange for their permission to videotape the procedures. While voluntary chemical or surgical castration is legal for repeat sex offenders in certain US states, for individuals undergoing sex reassignment surgery, and for other medical reasons, in otherwise healthy individuals a desire for castration is often viewed as psychotic.

The Huntington, Indiana, county prosecutor charged Bodkin with practicing medicine without a license, a Class C felony that made him eligible for thousands in fines and up to eight years in prison. He ultimately admitted to performing five castrations (he also kept "the trophies," in jars labelled with dates, initials, and an L or R). On April 12, 1999, Judge Mark McIntosh sentenced Bodkin to four years in jail, with two-and-a-half years suspended and credit for 69 days served. In a prepared statement, Bodkin said:

I felt it prudent to spare the court unnecessary time considerations and graphic details regarding this case. Such details might be repugnant to some and a source of folly for others ... My activities were conducted at the specific request of the parties ... to absolve emotional, psychological or physical needs ... not merely the spurious fancy of some alternate lifestyle.

Bodkin was arrested in August 2011 by the Elmore County Sheriff's Office.  Bodkin was brought to the attention of law enforcement after he sent sexually explicit material, including child pornography to an inmate of the Massachusetts Department of Correction's Treatment Center for Sexually Dangerous Persons.  After obtaining a search warrant for Bodkin's home in Slapout, Alabama sheriff's deputies found additional child pornography and photos of human castrations. According to law enforcement Bodkin admitted to recording children as young as one month old in sexual acts. Further investigation of Bodkin was turned over to the Secret Service.

References

Body modification
Genital modification and mutilation
American male criminals
People from Kokomo, Indiana
Year of birth missing (living people)
Living people